Ralph Dolphus Burgin (September 3, 1907 – April 29 1957) was an American baseball third baseman for several teams in the Negro leagues. He played from 1930 to 1940.

References

External links
 and Baseball-Reference Black Baseball stats and Seamheads

1907 births
1957 deaths
Baltimore Black Sox players
Hilldale Club players
Bacharach Giants players
New York Black Yankees players
Pittsburgh Crawfords players
Philadelphia Stars players
Brooklyn Royal Giants players
Baseball infielders
Burials at Long Island National Cemetery